, known as Deadly Skies in Europe, is a series of combat flight simulation games developed and published by Konami. The series began in 1999 with Airforce Delta for Dreamcast, with its last main series game being the 2004 Airforce Delta Strike.

The series has been compared to Ace Combat in its gameplay.

Games

Airforce Delta 
Airforce Delta, known as Deadly Skies in Europe, was released in 1999 for the Dreamcast.

Airforce Delta (Game Boy Color) 
A Game Boy Color version of Airforce Delta was released in 2000.

Airforce Delta Storm 
Airforce Delta Storm (called Airforce Delta II in Japan and Deadly Skies in Europe), was released for Xbox in 2001.

Airforce Delta Storm (Game Boy Advance) 

The Game Boy Advance version of Airforce Delta Storm was released in 2002, and has a plot based mostly on the previous game in the series, Airforce Delta.

Airforce Delta Strike 
Airforce Delta Strike (called Airforce Delta: Blue Wing Knights in Japan and Deadly Skies III in Europe), was released for the PlayStation 2 in 2004.

Airforce Delta Alternative 
Airforce Delta Alternative was a Japan-only mobile game released in 2007.

References 

 
Konami franchises
Video game franchises introduced in 1999